The Dorion level crossing accident occurred on October 7, 1966, when a school bus carrying 42 students was struck by a CN Rail freight train travelling at full speed in Dorion, Quebec, Canada (now a part of Vaudreuil-Dorion).

Summary
On the evening of October 7, at about 7:35 p.m., approximately 40 students were travelling by school bus to a dance, when the bus reached a level crossing. The gates lowered, preventing the school bus from crossing and allowing an eastbound train to continue its route. After the train had passed, the gates rose, allowing the school bus to cross. As the bus began to drive over the level crossing, an unseen second train (with 101 cars in tow) headed westbound, struck the bus and split it in half, dragging one half with it for over 2000 feet (600 m). The other half of the bus was found in a ditch approximately 300 feet (91 m) from the crossing.

Of the 41 people aboard, 19 were killed instantly, including the bus driver, with the deceased ranging in age from 12 to 20 years old. Many of the injured were taken to the Lakeshore General Hospital in Pointe-Claire. One young man subsequently died of his injuries. Funerals for the deceased occurred on October 11, 1966 at the Cité-des-Jeunes high school, where the students had gone to school.

Investigation 
After the accident there was much speculation as to its cause. Hypotheses included malfunctioning crossing gates, and that a number of students lifted the gate to clear the bus's path. After years of investigation the coroner released a statement declaring accidental death with no criminality, and the investigation was closed soon thereafter. The coroner's report concluded the crossing gates were not defective and that eyewitness testimony proved that two or more students lifted the gates despite the possibility of another oncoming train.

Aftermath 
After receiving numerous complaints, requests to reopen the investigation and public demonstrations of disagreement by the citizens of the city of Dorion, the level crossing was replaced by a double underpass by direction of Paul Gérin-Lajoie during November 1972.

In 1999 a commemorative plaque was unveiled in Vaudreuil-Dorion with the names of the 21 victims inscribed. Included in the victim count was a student who never fully recuperated from her crash injuries and died in 1998 at the age of 48. Some survivors gather each year at the plaque and accident site each year to honour the victims, and gathered at the Trinity Church in Dorion to commemorate the 50th anniversary of the accident.

On October 7, 2006, Francine Tougas displayed her documentary entitled Survivre at the Cité-des-Jeunes high school. Survivre documents the reaction to the Dorion level crossing accident by the government, CN Rail, citizens of the city of Dorion, the families of the 19 students killed, and the families of the surviving students.

See also

 List of rail accidents in Canada
 List of rail accidents (1960–1969)

References 

 

Bus incidents in Canada
Railway accidents and incidents in Canada
Level crossing incidents in Canada
Accidental deaths in Quebec
Railway accidents in 1966
1966 in Canada
Disasters in Quebec
Transport in Montérégie
Rail transport in Montérégie
Accidents and incidents involving Canadian National Railway
October 1966 events in Canada
Vaudreuil-Dorion
1966 disasters in Canada